Donn Swaby (born August 20, 1973) is an American actor. He is best known for playing the role of Chad Harris-Crane on the television soap opera Passions.

Career

He attended and graduated from Archbishop Molloy High School in Queens, New York, then attended Boston University, receiving a degree. He played the role of Chad on Passions from the show's debut in July 1999 until September 2002, when he was replaced by Charles Divins.

Filmography

Film

Television

Awards and nominations

External links
Official Website (archived)
Another Passions Hunk to Exit

1973 births
American male soap opera actors
Boston University alumni
Living people
People from Queens, New York
Archbishop Molloy High School alumni